Sidi Slimane is a village in the commune of Bayadha, in Bayadha District, El Oued Province, Algeria.

References

Neighbouring towns and cities

Populated places in El Oued Province